Government Arts College, Udumalpet, is a general degree college located at Udumalpet, Tamil Nadu. The college is affiliated with Bharathiar University. This college offers different courses in arts, commerce and science.

Departments

Science
Mathematics
Physics
Chemistry
Computer Science
Botany
Zoology

Arts and Commerce
Tourism
Tamil
English
Economics
Commerce

Accreditation
The college is  recognized by the University Grants Commission (UGC).

References

External links

Colleges affiliated to Bharathiar University